French protectorate may refer to:
The French protectorate of Cambodia
The French protectorate of Laos
The French protectorate in Morocco
The French protectorate of Tunisia
The Annam (French protectorate)
The Tonkin (French protectorate)
The Malagasy Protectorate
The Saar Protectorate